Paraproba is a genus of plant bugs in the family Miridae. There are at least 20 described species in Paraproba.

Species
These 26 species belong to the genus Paraproba:

References

Further reading

 
 
 
 
 
 
 
 

Miridae genera
Orthotylini